Biberbach is a river of Bavaria, Germany. It flows into the Mühlbach, a branch of the Main, in Michelau in Oberfranken.

See also
List of rivers of Bavaria

References

Rivers of Bavaria
Rivers of Germany